Echo Chamber may refer to:

 Echo chamber, a type of chamber for enhanced sound reflection
 Echo chamber (media), the self/re-amplification of ideas

Music
 Ace Tone Echo Chamber, a series of sound effects machines, see Ace Tone

Songs
 Echo Chamber 2000 song off the album We Are The Ark by The Ark (Swedish band)
 Echo Chamber 2011 song by Parts & Labor from the album Constant Future
 Echoless Chamber 2011 song by Vektor from the album Outer Isolation
 Echo Chamber 2017 song by Veil of Maya from the album False Idol
 Echo Chamber 2018 song by Spring King from the album A Better Life (Spring King album)
 Echo Chamber 2019 single released by Despite (band)
 Echo Chamber 2021 song by Northlane from the album Obsidian

Albums
 Echo Chamber (2014 EP) by Jaani Peuhu
 Echo Chamber (RJ Thompson album), 2017
 Echo Chamber (MC Paul Barman album), stylized as (((Echo Chamber))), 2018

Other uses
 Echo Chamber, a video game expansion pack for Destiny: The Taken King
 Echo Chamber, a TV commercial for Toyota directed by Meiert Avis
 The Echo Chamber (2011 novel) novel by Luke Williams

See also

Anechoic chamber, a chamber of silence
Echo (disambiguation)
Chamber (disambiguation)